Khagendra Sangraula (born 1946) is a Nepalese writer, novelist and columnist. He has published multiple books and wrote multiple articles for various national dailies. He has also translated many English essays and books including the memoir of John Wood, into Nepali language.  He is a regular columnist at Kantipur newspaper. His works played an important role during the Nepalese civil war in raising awareness among the general public.

Early life and education 
He was born on 25 November 1946 (10 Mangshir 2003 BS) in Subhang village, Panchthar district, Nepal. He did his schooling from Saraswati Middle School. He received an IA degree from Birendra Inter College (now  Terhathum Multiple Campus) in Tehrathum district. He then received a Bachelor degree specializing in Nepali and English from Tri-Chandra College. He joined Tribhuvan University, Kirtipur for Masters studied but did not completed the degree. He used to teach to fulfill his expenses. After graduation too, he continued teaching, he taught for 14 years in Chitwan, Tanahun and Lamjung districts in western Nepal.

Literary career 
He began his literary career with Adhuro Prem, Bhijeko Rumal in Bihani newspaper in 2024 BS.

He has published 5 short story collection, 5 essay collections, 3 novels, 3 plays and 36 translations as of 2019. He is known for his use of style of satire in his works.

He has received Mainali Puraskar, Krishna Mani Sahitya Puraskar and Gokul Joshi Puraskar. He won the Padmashree Sahitya Puraskar for his essays collection Aafnai Aakha ko Layama.

Bibliography
Balyakalkaa Padchapharu
Kunsai Kaka Ka Katha
Samjhanaka Kuinetaharu
Junkiriko Sangeet
Aama Ra Yamadutharu
Bais Thunga Phool
Samjhanako Ainaka Tasbirharu
Jan-Andolanka Charraharu
Aafnai Aakha ko Layama
Satya ra Satta

Personal life 
He currently resides in Kathmandu with his wife Jamuna Gurung. He met his wife in Bandipur hospital in Tanahun where she worked as a nurse. They have a son and a daughter.

References

Nepali-language writers
Nepalese satirists
1946 births
Living people
Padmashree Sahitya Puraskar winners
Nepalese columnists
Khas people
Tri-Chandra College alumni
People from Panchthar District
21st-century Nepalese male writers
Nepali-language writers from Nepal